Many foreign films have been shot in Morocco. The first were by the French film pioneer Louis Lumière Le chevrier Marocain. Orson Welles filmed his Othello there, which won the Palme d'Or prize at the Cannes Film Festival. In 1955, Alfred Hitchcock directed The Man Who Knew Too Much, set in Marrakech and Casablanca, while in 1962 David Lean shot the desert scenes of Lawrence of Arabia in Morocco.

Overview
The following is a list of some films that were entirely or partially shot in Morocco:

1951: Othello, directed by Orson Welles
1953: Flight to Tangier, directed by Charles Marquis Warren
1956: The Man Who Knew Too Much
1962: Lawrence of Arabia, starred Peter O'Toole, Omar Sharif
1967: The Burning, directed by Stephen Frears, starring Mark Baillie and Gwen Ffrangcon-Davies
1967: Oedipus Rex, directed by Pier Paolo Pasolini, starred Franco Citti
1970: Patton, directed by Franklin Schaffner
1975: The Man Who Would Be King, directed by John Huston
1976: Emanuelle in Bangkok, directed by Joe D'Amato
1977: Jesus of Nazareth, directed by Franco Zeffirelli
1977: The Arms of Venus, directed by Mircea Drăgan
1981: Rollover, directed by Alan Pakula, starred Jane Fonda
1985: Harem, directed by Arthur Joffé, starred Nastassja Kinski
1985: The Jewel of the Nile, directed by Lewis Teague, starred Michael Douglas
1987: The Living Daylights, directed by John Glen, starred Timothy Dalton and Maryam d'Abo
1988: The Last Temptation of Christ, directed by Martin Scorsese, starred Willem Dafoe
1989: Marrakech Express, directed by Gabriele Salvatores
1990: The Sheltering Sky, directed by Bernardo Bertolucci, starred John Malkovich and Debra Winger
1994: Highlander III: The Sorcerer, directed by Andrew Morahan, starred Christopher Lambert
1997: Kundun, directed by Martin Scorsese
1998: Hamilton, directed by Harald Zwart
1998: Hideous Kinky (Marrakech Express)
1999: The Mummy, directed by Stephen Sommers, starred Brendan Fraser
2000: Gladiator, directed by Ridley Scott, starred Russell Crowe
2000: Rules of Engagement, directed by William Friedkin, starred Tommy Lee Jones, Samuel L. Jackson and Guy Pearce
2001: Black Hawk Down, directed by Ridley Scott
2001: The Mummy Returns, directed by Stephen Sommers, starred Brendan Fraser
2001: Spy Game, directed by Tony Scott, starred Robert Redford and Brad Pitt
2002: Astérix et Obélix: Mission Cléopâtre (France), directed by Alain Chabat, starred Gérard Depardieu and Jamel Debbouze
2002: Live from Baghdad, directed by Mick Jackson, starred Michael Keaton
2004: Alexander, directed by Oliver Stone
2004: Exorcist: The Beginning, directed by Renny Harlin, starred Stellan Skarsgård
2004: Hidalgo, directed by Joe Johnston
2004: Les temps qui changent, directed by André Téchiné
2005: Kingdom of Heaven, directed by Ridley Scott
2005: Sahara, directed by Breck Eisner, starred Matthew McConaughey, Steve Zahn, Penélope Cruz and William H. Macy
2006: Babel, directed by Alejandro González Iñárritu
2006: The Hills Have Eyes, directed by Alexandre Aja
2007: Arn – The Knight Templar, directed by Peter Flinth
2007: The Bourne Ultimatum, directed by Paul Greengrass
2007: The Hills Have Eyes 2, directed by Martin Weisz
2008: Arn – The Kingdom at Road's End, directed by Peter Flinth
2008: Body of Lies, directed by Ridley Scott, starred Leonardo DiCaprio and Russell Crowe
2009:  Pope Joan, directed by Sönke Wortmann, starring John Goodman and Johanna Wokalek
2010: Inception, directed by Christopher Nolan
2010: Of Gods and Men, directed by Xavier Beauvois
2010: Prince of Persia: The Sands of Time, directed by Mike Newell
2010: Sex and the City 2, directed by Michael Patrick King
2011: Captain Phillips, directed by Paul Greengrass
2011: Hanna, directed by Joe Wright
2011: The Source, directed by Radu Mihăileanu
2013: The Bible, produced by Roma Downey and Mark Burnett
2013: Only Lovers Left Alive, directed by Jim Jarmusch
2014: American Sniper, directed by Clint Eastwood
2014: Mission: Impossible – Rogue Nation, directed by Christopher McQuarrie
2014: Son of God, produced by Roma Downey and Mark Burnett
2015: A.D. The Bible Continues, produced by Roma Downey and Mark Burnett, starring Juan Pablo di Pace, Babou Ceesay, Richard Coyle and Vincent Regan
2015: Spectre, directed by Sam Mendes
2016: The Yellow Birds
2016: Damascus Cover
2016: Watch Them Fall
2016: War Dogs
2016: Whiskey Tango Foxtrot
2016: 13 Hours
2016: A Hologram for the King
2016: Our Kind of Traitor
2017: Raees
2017: Tiger Zinda Hai
2019: John Wick: Chapter 3 – Parabellum
2019: Men in Black: International
2021: Redemption Day, directed by Hicham Hajji
2022: Inventing Anna
2022: Dirty Angels

Other movies
 Ali baba et les quarante voleurs, Fernandel
 Cleopatra

Foreign TV Series Shot In Morocco 
 Cleopatra
 The Young Indiana Jones Chronicles
 Game of Thrones (season 1 and 2)
 Homeland (TV series) (season 3, 6 and 8)
 Prison Break (TV) (2016)
 Tyrant (TV series) (2016)
 Jack Ryan (TV series) (2018)
 Vagabond (TV series) (2019)
 The Wheel of Time (TV series) (2021) SAS: Rogue Heroes (2022) No Man's Land (2022)  (season 2)''

See also
 Aït Benhaddou
 List of Absolutely Fabulous episodes

References

External links
 An extensive list of films shot in Morocco imdb  (Link not valid, Mar 2015)
 Morocco film locations  (Link not valid, Mar 2015)

 
Films shot in
Cinema of Morocco
Morocco